Foghat is a British rock band.

Foghat may also refer to:
Foghat (1972 album)
Foghat (1973 album) or Rock and Roll